This is a list of the Australian moth species of the family Gracillariidae. It also acts as an index to the species articles and forms part of the full List of moths of Australia.

Gracillarinae
Acrocercops aeglophanes Turner, 1913
Acrocercops aeolellum (Meyrick, 1880)
Acrocercops albida Turner, 1947
Acrocercops albomaculella (Turner, 1894)
Acrocercops alysidota (Meyrick, 1880)
Acrocercops antigrapha Turner, 1926
Acrocercops antimima Turner, 1940
Acrocercops apoblepta Turner, 1913
Acrocercops archepolis (Meyrick, 1907)
Acrocercops argyrodesma (Meyrick, 1882)
Acrocercops argyrosema Turner, 1947
Acrocercops autadelpha (Meyrick, 1880)
Acrocercops axinophora Turner, 1940
Acrocercops caenotheta (Meyrick, 1880)
Acrocercops calicella (Stainton, 1862)
Acrocercops candida Turner, 1947
Acrocercops chalcea Turner, 1926
Acrocercops chalceopla (Turner, 1913)
Acrocercops chionoplecta (Meyrick, 1882)
Acrocercops chionosema Turner, 1940
Acrocercops clinozona Meyrick, 1920
Acrocercops clisiophora Turner, 1940
Acrocercops crucigera Meyrick, 1920
Acrocercops didymella (Meyrick, 1880)
Acrocercops doloploca Meyrick, 1921
Acrocercops enchlamyda (Turner, 1894)
Acrocercops ennychodes Meyrick, 1921
Acrocercops eupetala (Meyrick, 1880)
Acrocercops euryschema Turner, 1947
Acrocercops grammatacma Meyrick, 1921
Acrocercops hedymopa Turner, 1913
Acrocercops hierocosma Meyrick, 1912
Acrocercops hoplocala (Meyrick, 1880)
Acrocercops irrorata (Turner, 1894)
Acrocercops isotoma Turner, 1940
Acrocercops laciniella (Meyrick, 1880)
Acrocercops leptalea (Turner, 1900)
Acrocercops leucomochla Turner, 1926
Acrocercops leucotoma Turner, 1913
Acrocercops lithogramma Meyrick, 1920
Acrocercops macaria Turner, 1913
Acrocercops mendosa Meyrick, 1912
Acrocercops mesochaeta Meyrick, 1920
Acrocercops nereis (Meyrick, 1880)
Acrocercops obscurella (Turner, 1894)
Acrocercops ochrocephala (Meyrick, 1880)
Acrocercops ochroptila Turner, 1913
Acrocercops ophiodes (Turner, 1896)
Acrocercops osteopa Meyrick, 1920
Acrocercops parallela (Turner, 1894)
Acrocercops penographa Meyrick, 1920
Acrocercops pertenuis Turner, 1923
Acrocercops plebeia (Turner, 1894)
Acrocercops plectospila Meyrick, 1921
Acrocercops poliocephala Turner, 1913
Acrocercops prospera Meyrick, 1920
Acrocercops pyrigenes (Turner, 1896)
Acrocercops retrogressa Meyrick, 1921
Acrocercops spodophylla Turner, 1913
Acrocercops stereomita Turner, 1913
Acrocercops symploca Turner, 1913
Acrocercops tetrachorda Turner, 1913
Acrocercops trapezoides (Turner, 1894)
Acrocercops tricalyx Meyrick, 1921
Acrocercops tricuneatella (Meyrick, 1880)
Acrocercops trisigillata Meyrick, 1921
Acrocercops tristaniae (Turner, 1894)
Acrocercops unilineata Turner, 1894
Aristaea acares (Turner, 1939)
Aristaea amalopa (Meyrick, 1907)
Aristaea machaerophora (Turner, 1940)
Aristaea periphanes Meyrick, 1907
Aristaea thalassias (Meyrick, 1880)
Aspilapteryx tessellata (Turner, 1940)
Caloptilia adelosema (Turner, 1940)
Caloptilia albospersa (Turner, 1894)
Caloptilia auchetidella (Meyrick, 1880)
Caloptilia aurora (Turner, 1894)
Caloptilia azaleella (Brants, 1913)
Caloptilia bryonoma (Turner, 1914)
Caloptilia chalcoptera (Meyrick, 1880)
Caloptilia chlorella (Turner, 1894)
Caloptilia cirrhopis (Meyrick, 1907)
Caloptilia crasiphila (Meyrick, 1912)
Caloptilia crocostola (Turner, 1917)
Caloptilia ecphanes (Turner, 1940)
Caloptilia euglypta (Turner, 1894)
Caloptilia eurycnema (Turner, 1894)
Caloptilia eurythiota (Turner, 1913)
Caloptilia euxesta (Turner, 1913)
Caloptilia iophanes (Meyrick, 1912)
Caloptilia ischiatris (Meyrick, 1907)
Caloptilia leucolitha (Meyrick, 1912)
Caloptilia liparoxantha (Meyrick, 1920)
Caloptilia loxocentra (Turner, 1915)
Caloptilia megalotis (Meyrick, 1908)
Caloptilia oenopella (Meyrick, 1880)
Caloptilia ostracodes (Turner, 1917)
Caloptilia pedina (Turner, 1923)
Caloptilia peltophanes (Meyrick, 1907)
Caloptilia perixesta (Turner, 1913)
Caloptilia plagata (Stainton, 1862)
Caloptilia plagiotoma (Turner, 1913)
Caloptilia scutigera (Meyrick, 1921)
Caloptilia stictocrossa (Turner, 1947)
Caloptilia thiophylla (Turner, 1913)
Caloptilia thiosema (Turner, 1913)
Caloptilia xanthopharella (Meyrick, 1880)
Caloptilia xylophanes (Turner, 1894)
Caloptilia xystophanes (Turner, 1913)
Caloptilia octopunctata (Turner, 1894)
Caloptilia cyanoxantha (Meyrick, 1920)
Caloptilia panchrista (Turner, 1913) (formerly a synonym of Caloptilia protiella (Deventer, 1904))
Calybites lepidella (Meyrick, 1880)
Conopomorpha antimacha Meyrick, 1907
Conopomorpha chionochtha Meyrick, 1907
Conopomorpha cramerella (Snellen, 1904)
Conopomorpha habrodes Meyrick, 1907
Conopomorpha heliopla Meyrick, 1907
Conopomorpha zaplaca Meyrick, 1907
Cuphodes didymosticha Turner, 1940
Cuphodes habrophanes Turner, 1940
Cuphodes holoteles (Turner, 1913)
Cuphodes lechriotoma (Turner, 1913)
Cuphodes lithographa (Meyrick, 1912)
Cuphodes maculosa Turner, 1940
Cuphodes niphadias (Turner, 1913)
Cuphodes profluens (Meyrick, 1916)
Cuphodes thysanota Meyrick, 1897
Cuphodes zophopasta (Turner, 1913)
Cyphosticha albomarginata (Stainton, 1862)
Cyphosticha callimacha (Meyrick, 1920)
Cyphosticha dialeuca Turner, 1940
Cyphosticha microta (Turner, 1894)
Cyphosticha panconita Turner, 1913
Cyphosticha pandoxa Turner, 1913
Cyphosticha pyrochroma (Turner, 1894)
Dialectica aemula (Meyrick, 1916)
Dialectica scalariella (Zeller, 1850)
Diphtheroptila ochridorsellum (Meyrick, 1880)
Epicephala acrobaphes (Turner, 1900)
Epicephala albistriatella (Turner, 1894)
Epicephala australis (Turner, 1896)
Epicephala bathrobaphes Turner, 1947
Epicephala colymbetella Meyrick, 1880
Epicephala epimicta (Turner, 1913)
Epicephala eugonia Turner, 1913
Epicephala lomatographa Turner, 1913
Epicephala nephelodes Turner, 1913 (synonym: Epicephala stephanephora Turner, 1923)
Epicephala spumosa Turner, 1947
Epicephala trigonophora (Turner, 1900)
Epicephala zalosticha Turner, 1940
Epicnistis euryscia Meyrick, 1906
Gibbovalva quadrifasciata (Stainton, 1863)
Macarostola ageta (Turner, 1917)
Macarostola formosa (Stainton, 1862)
Macarostola ida (Meyrick, 1880)
Macarostola miltopepla (Turner, 1926)
Macarostola polyplaca (Lower, 1894)
Macarostola rosacea (Turner, 1940)
Melanocercops melanommata (Turner, 1913)
Metacercops cuphomorpha (Turner, 1940)
Monocercops actinosema (Turner, 1923)
Neurostrota gunniella (Busck, 1906)
Parectopa clethrata Lower, 1923
Parectopa leucographa Turner, 1940
Parectopa lyginella (Meyrick, 1880)
Parectopa mnesicala (Meyrick, 1880)
Parectopa ophidias (Meyrick, 1907)
Parectopa toxomacha (Meyrick, 1882)
Parectopa tyriancha Meyrick, 1920
Pogonocephala heteropsis (Lower, 1894)
Polysoma eumetalla (Meyrick, 1880)

Lithocolletinae
Phyllonorycter conista (Meyrick, 1911) (synonym: Phyllonorycter clarisona (Meyrick, 1916))
Phyllonorycter enchalcoa (Turner, 1939)
Phyllonorycter lalagella (Newman, 1856)
Phyllonorycter messaniella (Zeller, 1846)
Phyllonorycter stephanota (Meyrick, 1907)
Porphyrosela aglaozona (Meyrick, 1882)
Porphyrosela dismochrysa (Lower, 1897)

Phyllocnistinae
Phyllocnistis acmias Meyrick, 1906
Phyllocnistis atractias Meyrick, 1906
Phyllocnistis atranota Meyrick, 1906
Phyllocnistis citrella Stainton, 1856
Phyllocnistis diaugella Meyrick, 1880
Phyllocnistis dichotoma Turner, 1947
Phyllocnistis diplomochla Turner, 1923
Phyllocnistis ephimera Turner, 1926
Phyllocnistis eurymochla Turner, 1923
Phyllocnistis hapalodes Meyrick, 1906
Phyllocnistis iodocella Meyrick, 1880
Phyllocnistis leptomianta Turner, 1923
Phyllocnistis nymphidia Turner, 1947
Phyllocnistis psychina Meyrick, 1906
Phyllocnistis triortha Meyrick, 1906

The following species belong to the subfamily Phyllocnistinae, but have not been assigned to a genus yet. Given here is the original name given to the species when it was first described:
Eurytyla automacha Meyrick, 1893
Gracilaria confectella Walker, 1864
Gracilaria delicatulella Walker, 1864

External links 
Gracillariidae at Australian Faunal Directory
Gracillariidae at Insects of Australia

Australia
Gracillariidae